Al-Maṣāni may refer to:

Al-Maṣani, Abyan, Yemen
Al-Maṣani, Hadhramaut, Yemen